Plautdietsch-Freunde is a Detmold-based non-profit organization with the goal of documenting, nurturing, and promoting the Plautdietsch language. Mennonite speakers of Plautdietsch who emigrated from West Prussia through Southern Russia (present-day Ukraine), and who now live in Germany, Canada, Paraguay, and other parts of the world, are also known as Russian Mennonites and have been united by religious practices. Through its web resources and its journal Plautdietsch FRIND, Plautdietsch-Freunde offers an international forum for all those who speak, read, write, or simply have an interest in the language. The organization was founded by Peter Wiens in 1999, acting president is Heinrich Siemens.

External links 
 Plautdietsch-Freunde e. V. (web site in German and Plautdietsch)
 Russian German Mennonites Around the World Join Efforts in the Web to Save their Mother Tongue  (by Peter Wiens)
 Institut für niederdeutsche Sprache (INS, organization for Low German languages)
 European Charter for Regional or Minority Language

Language advocacy organizations
Mennonitism in Germany
Non-profit organisations based in North Rhine-Westphalia
Plautdietsch language